Hajiya Zainab Maina, FCIA, MFR (born 7 August 1948) was the Minister of Women Affairs and Social Development of the Federal Republic of Nigeria. She was appointed in July 2011.

Education and personal life 

Zainab Maina hails from Adamawa State in North-East Nigeria. She was educated at Kaduna Polytechnic where she obtained a Diploma in Administration and Higher National Diploma in Catering and Hotel Management. In addition, she also obtained a certificate in Secretarial Studies from the Federal Training Centre Kaduna and the Centre for Development & Population, Washington DC, USA  where she received a Certificate in Institution Building Activities. She is married to Alhaji Umar Joji Maina, the Dan-maliki of Mubi in Adamawa State and they have children.

Political and governmental career 
Prior to her ministerial appointment in July 2011, Zainab Maina was:
Board Chairman, National Commission for Nomadic Education, Kaduna (2009–2011);
Board Chairman, Garki Microfinance Bank (1998);
Board Chairman, NCWS, Garki Microfinance Bank, Abuja (1997);
Deputy Chairman, Police Community Relations Committee FCT Command (1998-Date);
Member, Vision 2010 Committee (1997);
Board Member, National Programme on Immunization (1998–2000);
Board Member, Adamawa State Primary Schools Board (1991–1994);
Board Member, Family Economic Advancement Programme (FEAP) (1997–2000).

She was the National President – National Council for Women Societies (NCWS), Nigeria (1997-2001). In the ruling party in Nigeria, Peoples Democratic Party (PDP), Zainab Maina holds sway as part of the think-tank as Member, PDP Elders Committee; Member, PDP Board of Trustees; executive director, Women Affairs of the Jonathan/Sambo Presidential Campaign (2010); Member, PDP Presidential Electoral/Screening Committee (2010); National Women Representative, PDP Presidential Campaign Council (2007); Delegate, National Political Reform Conference (NPRC)-2005; Women Representative, PDP Reconciliation Committee on theExecutive/Legislative Impasse(2002); International Convener, Home Economics and Consumer Affairs International Council of Women (ICW) Bangkok, Thailand (1993).

Non-governmental work 
Founder and President, Women for Peace Initiative (WOPI) Nigeria
Patron, Young Muslim Women Association, Nigeria
Sub-Regional Coordinator- Anglophone Africa, International Council for Women
Member, World Association of NGOs (WANGO)
Member, West African Civil Society Forum (WACSOF)
INGO Ambassador, International Non-Governmental Organization(London, UK)

Awards and honours 
National Award of Excellence towards Women Development Abuja, Nigeria
Jean Harris Award – Rotary International
Winner of the Distinguished Eagle Achievement Award Newark, New Jersey, USA
Amazon Women Award for Contribution towards the Development of Womanhood, Lagos, Nigeria.
Africa Youth Congress Award on the authority of the Senate Headquarters, Banjul, the Gambia
Merit Award by the Mayor of Atlanta, USA
Meritorious Certificate for Loyal and Devoted Services to Development by the Nawar-U-Deen Society of Nigeria
Certificate of Recognition – University of Kansas, Lawrence, USA
Quintessence Award for Remarkable Contribution to Humanity by media in support of Humanity (MISH)
Ambassador for peace by the Universal Peace Federation and the Inter-Religious and International federation for world peace
Honorary citizen of Kansas City, USA
Fellow, African Business School – FABS
Fellow Chartered Institute of Administration – FCIA
Member of the Order of the Federal Republic – MFR

References

1948 births
Living people
Nigerian women in politics
People from Adamawa State
Members of the Order of the Federal Republic
Kaduna Polytechnic alumni